Shahrak-e Emam Khomeyni (also Romanized as Shahrak-e Emām Khomeynī) is a village in Bakharz Rural District, in the Central District of Bakharz County, Razavi Khorasan Province, Iran. At the 2006 census, its population was 265, in 58 families.

References 

Populated places in Bakharz County